Areas of Critical Environmental Concern (ACEC) is a conservation ecology program in the Western United States, managed by the Bureau of Land Management (BLM). The ACEC program was conceived in the 1976 Federal Lands Policy and Management Act (FLPMA), which established the first conservation ecology mandate for the BLM. The FLPMA mandate directs the BLM to protect important riparian corridors, threatened and endangered species habitats, cultural and archeological resources, as well as unique scenic landscapes that the agency assesses as in need of special management attention.

Criteria
To be considered a potential ACEC an area must meet criteria of both relevance and importance.

Relevance
An area meets the relevance criteria of an ACEC if it contains one or more of the following:
A significant historic, cultural, or scenic value;
A fish or wildlife resource;
A natural process or system (including but not limited to areas supporting rare, endemic, relict, or endangered plant species, or rare geological features);
Natural hazards (most notably areas of avalanche, unstable soils, rockfall).

Importance
An area meets the importance criteria if it is characterized by one or more of the following:
Has more than locally significant qualities;
Has qualities or circumstances that make it fragile, sensitive, irreplaceable, rare, unique;
Has been recognized as warranting protection to satisfy national priority concerns or to carry out the mandates of the Federal Land Policy and Management Act;
Has qualities which warrant concern about safety and public welfare;
Poses a significant threat to human life and safety, or to property.

Designated ACECs

Alaska

Sukakpak Mountain (2944 acres)

Arizona

Witch Pool (279 acres)
Nampaweap (535 acres)
Pakoon (76,014 acres)
Beaver Dam Slope (51,197 acres)
Virgin River Corridor (8,075 acres)
Virgin Slope (39,931 acres)
Little Black Mountain (241 acres)
Fort Pearce (916 acres)
Marble Canyon (11,012 acres)
Johnson Springs (2,464 acres)
Lost Spring Mountain (8,262 acres)
Moonshine Ridge (5,095 acres)
Big Marias
Dripping Spring
Sears Poing

California
 Afton Canyon 
 Carrizo Plain
Conway Summit
 Jawbone-Butterbredt Area of Critical Environmental Concern
 Joaquin Rocks
 North Algodones Dunes
 Pilot Knob
 The Red Hills of Tuolumne County
 Serpentine Area of Critical Environmental Concern
 Yuha Desert

Colorado 

Adobe Badlands – 
American Basin – 
Anasazi Culture – 
Arkansas Canyonlands – 
Atwell Gulch – 
Badger Wash – 
Barger Gulch Heritage Area – 
Beaver Creek – 
Black's Gulch – 
Blanca Wildlife Habitat Area – 
Blue Hill – 
Browns Canyon – 
Bull Gulch – 
Coal Draw – 
Coal Oil Rim – 
Cucharas Canyon – 
Cumbres and Toltec Railroad – 
Debris Hazard – 
Deep Creek – 
Deer Gulch – 
Dillon Pinnacles – 
Droney Gulch – 
Duck Creek – 
Dudley Bluffs – 
East Douglas Creek – 
Elephant Rocks – 
Escalante Canyon – 
Fairview – 
Garden Park National Natural Landmark – 
Glenwood Springs Debris Flow Hazard Zones – 
Grand Hogback – 
Grape Creek – 
Gunnison Gravels – 
Gunnison Sage Grouse – 
Gypsum Valley – 
Hardscrabble-East Eagle – 
Indian Creek – 
Irish Canyon – 
Juanita Arch – 
Kremmling – 
Kremling Ammonite Site Research Natural Area – 
Laramie River – 
Los Mogotes – 
Lower Colorado River – 
Lower Greasewood Creek – 
Lyons Gulch – 
McCoy Fan Delta – 
McElmo Rare Lizard and Snake – 
Moosehead Mountain – 
Mosquito Pass – 
Mount Logan Foothills – 
Mt. Garfield – 
Native Plant Community – 
Needle Rock – 
North Park Natural Area – 
North Park Phaceila – 
North Sand Hills – 
Oil Spring Mountain – 
Phantom Canyon – 
Pyramid Rock – 
Rajadero Canyon – 
Raven Ridge – 
Red Cloud Peak – 
Rio Grande – 
Roan and Carr Creeks – 
Rough Canyon – 
Ryan Gulch – 
San Luis Hills/Flattop – 
San Miguel River – 
Sheep Creek Uplands – 
Sinbad Valley – 
Slumgullion National Natural Landmark – 
South Beaver Creek – 
South Cathedral Bluffs – 
South Shale Ridge – 
The Palisade – 
Thompson Creek – 
Trickle Mountain – 
Troublesome Creek – 
Unaweep Seep Research Natural Area – 
West Antelope Creek – 
White River Riparian – 
Yanks Gulch/Upper Greasewood Creek –

Idaho
 Menan Buttes
 Long-billed Curlew Habitat

Montana 

(For more detailed descriptions of the following sites see)
 Acid Shale-Pine Forest (endemic plant community, Lewistown Office)
 Ash Creek Divide (paleo, Miles City Office)
 Battle Butte (cultural, Miles City)
 Bear Creek Flats (wildlife, oldgrowth pine, recreation, Missoula Office)
 Beaverhead Rock (historic petroglyphs, Dillon Office)
 Big Bend of the Milk River (archaeological resources , Malta)
 Big Sheep Mountain (cultural, Miles City)
 Black-footed ferret (wildlife, Miles City)
 Block Mountain (geological education, Dillon)
 Bridger Fossil (paleo, Billings Office)
 Bug Creek (paleo, Miles City)
 Castle Butte (cultural, Billings)
 Collar Gulch (cutthroat trout, Lewistown)
 Everson Creek (Stone Age archaeological site, Dillon)
 Finger Buttes (scenic, Miles City)
 Hell Creek (paleo, Miles City)
 Hoe (cultural, Miles City)
 Howrey Island (wildlife, Miles City)
 Jordan Bison Kill (cultural, Miles City Office)
 Petroglyph Canyon (cultural, Billings)
 Piping Plover (wildlife, Miles City)
 Powder River Depot (cultural, Miles City)
 Prairie Dog Towns, (black-footed ferret reintroduction site, Malta)
 Rattler Gulch Limestone Cliffs (scenic, Missoula office. See Garnet Range for description)
 Reynolds Battlefield (cultural, Miles City)
 Ringing Rocks (unique geology, Butte Office)
 Sand Arroyo (paleo, Miles City)
 Seline (cultural, Miles City)
 Stark Site (cultural, Billings)
Virginia City, Montana Historic District (historic, Dillon)
 Weatherman Draw (cultural, Billings)

Nevada
Ash Meadows
Beaver Dam Slope
Condor Canyon
Ivanpah
Mormon Mesa
Piute/Eldorado
Rainbow Gardens
River Mountains

New Mexico
Sombrillo
La Cienega
Simon Canyon
Florida Mountains
Sacramento Escarpment
Three Rivers Petroglyph
Alamo Hueco Mountains
Bear Creek
Blue Spring
Pecos River Canyon Complex
Big Hatchet Mountains
Cowboy Spring
Granite Gap
Guadalupe Canyon
Chosa Draw
Cookes Range
Gila Lower Box
Gila Middle Box
Alkali Lakes
Apache Box
Central Peloncillo Mountains
Uvas Valley
Black Grama
Cornudas Mountain
Wind Mountain
Alamo Mountain

Oregon 

 Wassen Creek (Natural systems and botanical values, Coos Bay Office)
 North Spit (Botanical, wildlife, and cultural values, Coos Bay Office)
 North Fork Coquille River (Natural systems; botanical fish values, Coos Bay Office)
 Tioga Creek (Natural systems, Coos Bay Office)
 Cherry Creek (Natural systems and botanical values, Coos Bay Office)
 China Wall (Natural systems; botanical and cultural values, Coos Bay Office)
 Upper Rock Creek (Natural systems and botanical values, Coos Bay Office)
 New River (Botanical, wildlife, fish and cultural values, Coos Bay Office)
 North Fork Hunter Creek (Natural systems; botanical and cultural values, Coos Bay Office)
 Hunter Creek Bog (Natural systems and botanical values, Coos Bay Office)
 North Fork Chetco River (Natural systems; and botanical, fish, and cultural values , Coos Bay Office)
 Upper and Lower Table Rock

Utah 

 Copper Globe (historic, Vernal office)
 Dark Canyon (59,755 acres, Monticello office)
 I-70 Scenic ACEC (scenic, Price office)
 Lears Canyon (habitat, Vernal office)
 Lower Green River (scenic, habitat, Vernal office)
 Nine Mile Canyon (scenic, cultural, Vernal office)
 Pariette Wetlands (habitat, Vernal office)
 San Rafael Canyon (scenic, Price office)
 San Rafael Reef (scenic, Price office)
 Scenic Highway Corridor (scenic, Monticello office)
 Sid's Mountain (scenic, Price office)
 Temple Mountain (historic, Price office)
 Bonneville Salt Flats ((convert30,203))

Wyoming 

 Greater Red Creek (175240 acres)
 Greater Sand Dunes (41644 acres)
Natural Corrals Archeological Site (1116 acres)
 Pine Springs (6055 acres)
 Special Status Plant Species (1009 acres)
 White Mountain Petroglyphs (21.7 acres)

See also

United States
Department of the Interior
Bureau of Land Management

References

External links
Massachusetts state ACES program

United States Department of the Interior
Protected areas of the United States
Nature conservation in the United States
1976 in the environment
1976 in the United States